Lamar Johnson Sr. (born September 2, 1950) is a retired American professional baseball player and former hitting coach for the Milwaukee Brewers, Kansas City Royals, Seattle Mariners and New York Mets. Johnson was a first baseman who played in the Major Leagues from 1974 to 1982 for the Chicago White Sox and Texas Rangers.

On perhaps the best day in his career, on June 19, 1977, against the A's, Johnson sang the National Anthem before the game, and followed up with two homers, the only White Sox hits on the day, as the Sox won 2-1.

Coaching career
Lamar's coaching career began in 1988, when he was hired by the Milwaukee Brewers as a minor league hitting instructor.  He coached in Milwaukee's minor league system through 1994, serving as the hitting coach for their AAA affiliate, the Denver Zephyrs, in 1991 and 1992, and as manager of their highest A ball affiliate, the Stockton Ports, in 1993 and 1994.

In December 1994, Lamar Johnson was named by manager Phil Garner as the hitting coach for the Brewers big league club. After having scored only 547 runs in 1994, the club scored 740 runs in 1995, and then 894 runs in 1996, a franchise record. After the offense stagnated over the next two seasons, Johnson was fired by the Brewers in August 1998.  But just three months later, the Kansas City Royals hired him to serve in the same capacity.

With the Royals, Johnson again had a remarkable amount of initial success.  After having scored 714 runs in 1998, the team scored a club record 856 runs in 1999, and then broke that record again in 2000 by scoring 879 runs, which remains the franchise record today. Of Jermaine Dye, who emerged in those years as a star player, beat writer Joe Posnanski wrote "Dye used to have a loopy swing. Now, thanks in part to hitting coach Lamar Johnson, the swing is as compact as a Honda." But Johnson was fired again nonetheless after the 2002 season, in which the Royals finished 11th in the American League in runs scored.

In 2003, Johnson served as hitting coach for the Seattle Mariners who, despite playing in a pitchers park, had one of the better offenses in the American League that season, winning 93 games.  But Johnson was not retained in 2004 despite this, as the offense slumped over the last month of the season.

Since 2005, he has worked in the Mets organization, first as a roving hitting instructor, then as minor league hitting coordinator.  With Johnson overseeing the development of young hitters, the Mets farm system has produced enough talent that on April 26, 2011, the team fielded a starting lineup of all homegrown players for the first time since 1971. On May 26, 2014, Johnson was made the new hitting coach for the Mets, replacing Dave Hudgens.  He served through the end of the season, then was reassigned as a minor league hitting instructor in the Mets' organization. He was replaced by former Yankees' coach Kevin Long for the 2015 season.

References

External links

1950 births
Living people
African-American baseball coaches
African-American baseball players
Águilas del Zulia players
Aliağa Petkim basketball players
Appleton Foxes players
Bandırma B.İ.K. players
Baseball players from Alabama
Chicago White Sox players
Denver Bears players
Duluth-Superior Dukes players
Gulf Coast White Sox players
Iowa Oaks players
Kansas City Royals coaches
Knoxville Sox players
Major League Baseball designated hitters
Major League Baseball first basemen
Major League Baseball hitting coaches
Milwaukee Brewers coaches
Minor league baseball managers
New York Mets coaches
Sportspeople from Bessemer, Alabama
Seattle Mariners coaches
St. Petersburg Pelicans players
Texas Rangers players
21st-century African-American people
20th-century African-American sportspeople